Choleretics are substances that increase the volume of secretion of bile from the liver as well as the amount of solids secreted.

See also
 Cholekinetic
 Hydrocholeretic

References 

Bile acids